Underskiddaw is a civil parish in the Borough of Allerdale in the English county of Cumbria. The parish lies immediately to the north of the town of Keswick, and includes the southern and eastern flanks of Skiddaw as well as part of the valley of the rivers Greta and Derwent, and a small part of Bassenthwaite Lake. The parish includes the settlements of Applethwaite, Millbeck and Ormathwaite, all of which lie along the line where the southern slopes of Skiddaw meet the valley.

The parish has a population of 282 in 122 households, reducing at the 2011 Census to a population of 264 in 128 households. It is within the Workington constituency of the United Kingdom Parliament. Prior to Brexit in 2020 it was part of the North West England constituency of the European Parliament.

Millbeck Hall belonged to the Williamson family. Edward Williamson of Millbeck died before 1577 owing money to the German copper miners at Keswick and Caldbeck. There is a carved stone doorway lintel dated 1592 with the name of the owner, Nicholas Williamson. The inscription in Latin has been translated as "Whither? to live and die, or to die and live". In March 1595, a distant cousin, also called Nicholas Williamson visited Millbeck. He was arrested and taken to the Tower of London for his part in a conspiracy.

See also

Listed buildings in Underskiddaw

References

External links
 Cumbria County History Trust: Underskiddaw (nb: provisional research only – see Talk page)

Civil parishes in Cumbria
Allerdale